Warren Caddy (born 9 April 1997) is a French professional footballer who plays as a forward for Ligue 2 club Paris FC.

Career
A product of Ajaccio's youth system, Caddy made his senior debut on 17 April 2015, coming on as a substitute for Laurent Abergel in a 2–0 defeat to Troyes at the Stade de l'Aube.

Personal life
Caddy was born in France and is of Martiniquais descent.

References

External links
 Warren Caddy at foot-national.com
 
 
 

1997 births
Living people
French footballers
French people of Martiniquais descent
Association football midfielders
AC Ajaccio players
RC Grasse players
US Colomiers Football players
FC Sète 34 players
Paris FC players
Ligue 2 players
Championnat National 2 players
Championnat National 3 players
People from Cagnes-sur-Mer
Sportspeople from Alpes-Maritimes
Footballers from Provence-Alpes-Côte d'Azur